

Historical and architectural interest bridges

Major bridges

References 

 

 Others references

See also 
 Transport in Syria
 List of Roman bridges

Syria

Bridges
b